Michael Per Axel Rubbestad (born 16 October 1980) is a Swedish politician who was elected as a member of the Riksdag in 2018 for the Sweden Democrats party.

Rubbestad is a councilor in Håbo Municipality and in the Riksdag serves on the Committee on Cultural Affairs. In addition to politics, Rubbestad has worked as an actor DJ, and trance musician, and has released albums under the stage name Aladdin.

References 

Living people
Swedish actors
Swedish DJs
1980 births
Swedish trance musicians
Members of the Riksdag from the Sweden Democrats
Members of the Riksdag 2018–2022
Members of the Riksdag 2022–2026
21st-century Swedish politicians